St Gabriel's School is a private co-educational day school (Nursery, Junior School, Senior School & Sixth Form) located at Sandleford Priory in Sandleford, two miles (3 km) south of Newbury, in the English county of Berkshire.

Pupils and Staff
St Gabriel’s is a co-educational day school, where pupils excel and reach their true potential through a balanced and inspiring education, which combines academic rigour, breadth of opportunity and a strong sense of community. St Gabriel's responsibility is to provide each pupil with the right combination of opportunities and challenges to create a pathway for academic success while at the same time unlocking and developing the talents of each individual pupil to give them the confidence and self-belief to pursue their ambitions.
In September 2022, St Gabriel's welcomed boys into Year 7 of the Senior School. The Sixth Form, alongside Year 9, will accept boys from September 2024. This incremental approach will ensure a measured and smooth transition to a fully co-educational school in 2026. There is now a school community of over 400 pupils. It is associated with traditional Church of England values.

History
St Gabriel's School was founded in 1929 in Mill Hill in London. In 1939 the school was evacuated to West Ogwell Manor in Devon for the safety of the pupils and because their Mill Hill, London site was requisitioned. The school remained in the West Country until 1943 when it relocated to Ormonde House, Newbury. After Easter in 1948 the school moved to Sandleford Priory.

Present building

It was erected around the chapel of an old priory between 1780 and 1786 by James Wyatt, for Elizabeth Montagu, the social reformer, patron of the arts, salonist, literary critic and writer who helped organise and lead the Blue Stockings Society.

References

External links
School Website
Profile on the ISC website

Girls' schools in Berkshire
Schools in Newbury, Berkshire
Preparatory schools in Berkshire
Private schools in West Berkshire District
Educational institutions established in 1947
1947 establishments in England
Church of England private schools in the Diocese of Oxford